Kurathi Magan is a 1972 Indian Tamil-language film directed by K. S. Gopalakrishnan. The film features Gemini Ganesan, K. R. Vijaya, Master Sridhar and Jayachitra introduced in the film, Shylashri, V. S. Raghavan, Suruli Rajan and Kamal Haasan in a brief role. R. Muthuraman plays a cameo. The film was released on 29 April 1972.

Plot
The plot is about how a mother from the Kuravar community sacrifices her motherhood for the sake of her son's future.

Cast
 Gemini Ganesan
 K. R. Vijaya
 M. N. Nambiar
 Master Sridhar
 Jayachitra
 Kamal Haasan
 R. Muthuraman (Cameo Appearance)
 Shylashri
 V. K. Ramasamy
 V. S. Raghavan
 O. A. K. Thevar
 Karikol Raju
 Suruli Rajan
 V. Gopalakrishnan
 Shanmugasundaram
 Shanmugasundari
 G. Sakunthala
 S. R. Janaki
 "Baby" Kumutha
 "Baby" Thamizh Selvi
 "Master" Rajkumar
 "Master" Bablu

Production 
Kurathi Magan directed by K. S. Gopalakrishnan. This was the debut movie of actress Jayachitra. Padmini and Sivakumar was considered for the Kurathi and Kurathi son role, before K. R. Vijaya and Master Sridhar was finalised. Padmini withdrew from the film 2 days after production began as a result of her marriage.

Soundtrack
The music was composed by K. V. Mahadevan, while the lyrics were written by Udumalai Narayana Kavi, Kannadasan and A. Maruthakasi.

Release 
Kurathi Magan was released on 29 April 1972.

References

External links 
 

1970s Tamil-language films
1972 films
Films directed by K. S. Gopalakrishnan
Films scored by K. V. Mahadevan
Films with screenplays by K. S. Gopalakrishnan